The term ozogamicin in the names of monoclonal antibodies or antibody-drug conjugates indicates that they are linked to a cytotoxic agent from the class of calicheamicins.

See also
Gemtuzumab ozogamicin
Inotuzumab ozogamicin

References 

Antibodies
Antibody-drug conjugates